Precious Kitten (foaled February 20, 2003 in Kentucky) is an American Thoroughbred racehorse who has won three career Grade 1 races.

In winning the 2007 Gallorette Handicap, Precious Kitten set a new Pimlico Race Course course record of 1:40.32 for 1 1/16 miles.

Her last outing was in the 2008 Breeders' Cup Mile in which she finished fourth to winner, Goldikova.

References
 Precious Kitten's pedigree and partial racing stats
 Precious Kitten's profile at the NTRA

2003 racehorse births
Racehorses bred in Kentucky
Racehorses trained in the United States
Thoroughbred family 2-d